Menahi (Arabic: مناحي) is a Saudi comedy film that was released in 2009. Fayez al-Malki is the lead actor. Renown Syrian actress Muna Wassef was also amongst the cast.

Plot
The film is about a Bedouin villager named "Menahi" who gets rich and decides to move to a big city.

Further details
It opened in Riyadh in 2009; the opening of Menahi was the first time films were screened in Riyadh for several decades. Men and girls under 12 were permitted to go to the screening.

References

2009 comedy films
2009 films
2000s Arabic-language films
Saudi Arabian comedy films